Yuri Ivanovich Nosenko (Ukrainian: Юрій Іванович Носенко; October 30, 1927 – August 23, 2008) was a KGB officer who defected to the United States in 1964. Controversy arose in the CIA over whether he was a bona fide defector and he was held in detention for over three years before he was finally accepted as a legitimate defector by the CIA. After his release, he became an American citizen, working as a consultant and trainer for the CIA.

Biography
Nosenko was born in Nikolaev, Ukrainian SSR (now Mykolaiv, Ukraine). His father, Ivan Nosenko, was USSR Minister of Shipbuilding from 1939 until his death in 1956. During the Second World War, Nosenko attended naval preparatory school, intending on a career in shipbuilding, like his father. After the war, he attended the Moscow State Institute of International Relations (MGIMO), graduating in 1950. On graduation he served in Naval Intelligence until he transferred to the KGB in 1953. In the KGB, he worked primarily in the Second Chief Directorate, which was responsible for internal security.

Defection
The below passage is taken verbatim from the declassified CIA document referencing Nosenko's defection and subsequent treatment.

 

Nosenko contacted the CIA in Geneva, when he accompanied a diplomatic mission to that city in 1962. Nosenko offered his services for a small amount of money, claiming that a prostitute had robbed him of $900 worth of Swiss francs. He claimed to be deputy chief of the Seventh Department of the KGB, and provided some information that would only be known by someone connected to the KGB. He was given the money he requested and told $25,000 a year would be deposited in an account in his name in the West. Then, at a meeting set up in 1964 he unexpectedly claimed that he had been discovered by the KGB and needed to defect immediately. Nosenko claimed that the Geneva KGB residency had received a cable recalling him to Moscow and he was fearful that he had been found out. NSA was later, but not at the time, able to determine that no such cable had been sent, and Nosenko subsequently admitted making this up to persuade the CIA to accept his defection, which the CIA did.

Assertions about the Kennedy assassination
Nosenko claimed that he could provide important negative information about the assassination of President John F. Kennedy, affirming that he had personally handled a review of the case of Lee Harvey Oswald, who had lived in the Soviet Union in the late 1950s and early 1960s. Nosenko said that, while the KGB had conducted surveillance of Oswald, it had never tried to recruit him. This issue was critical because KGB involvement with Oswald might suggest Soviet involvement in the Kennedy assassination, a prospect that could have propelled the Cold War into a nuclear war. Nosenko insisted that after interviewing Oswald it was decided that Oswald was not intelligent enough and also "too mentally unstable," a "nut" and therefore unsuitable for intelligence work. Nosenko also stated that the KGB had never questioned Oswald about information he might have gained as a U.S. Marine, including work as an aviation electronics operator at Naval Air Facility Atsugi in Japan.

Concerns that Nosenko was a triple agent
The CIA's Soviet Union division suspected that Nosenko was a KGB plant. One reason was that although he finally admitted that he was only a captain instead of a lieutenant colonel (claiming he had exaggerated his rank to make himself attractive to the CIA), the official KGB documents he had initially provided were examined by the CIA and proved that Nosenko was indeed a lieutenant colonel. A second reason was that an earlier KGB defector, Anatoliy Golitsyn, had predicted that the KGB would send someone after him to try to discredit him. Many inside the CIA thought Nosenko fitted this picture, partly because one of Golytsin's main claims was that the KGB had a mole deep in the CIA and Nosenko claimed there was not. Nosenko was seized by CIA officers in Washington and from 1964 to 1967 was subjected to increasingly harsh and hostile interrogation methods, including being held in solitary confinement in a CIA safe house in Clinton, Maryland, in an operation approved by CIA Director John A. McCone.

The situation was made more complex by another alleged defector controlled by the FBI, codenamed Fedora, a KGB agent who posed as a Soviet diplomat to infiltrate the United Nations and provide false information to the Americans. Fedora was later revealed to be a KGB colonel named Victor Mechislavich Lesovski. Fedora confirmed Nosenko's story about Oswald and that he was indeed a KGB colonel and genuine mole. At that point, the Nosenko issue evolved into an interservice confrontation. To the CIA, Nosenko was not a genuine KGB mole because he was found to have lied about his grade and his recall orders to the USSR. But the FBI accepted him as genuine, as agreeing that Nosenko was a KGB plant would consequently compromise the credibility of Fedora, the only Soviet source corroborating Nosenko's story.

Two lie detector tests conducted by the CIA suggested that Nosenko was lying. Nosenko claimed that the results of the first polygraph were prearranged in a way to break him, while prior to the second polygraph, he was examined by a doctor who "inserted a gloved finger inside Nosenko's rectum and, over his protests, wriggled it around for some ten minutes. The doctor suggested he liked the "degradation." Nosenko said that this was done to anger him and stimulate his blood pressure, a key factor in affecting polygraph readings." Moreover, Nosenko confessed that he had lied to the CIA about his military rank. However, Nosenko passed a third polygraph test given in August 1968, which also included questions about Oswald.

Part of the evidence against Nosenko was from the work of defected KGB Major and CIA agent Peter Deriabin. Deriabin had worked in the same parts of the Soviet KGB where Nosenko had claimed to have worked, but found the details of Nosenko's stories (which changed over time) to be unconvincing. Years after the incident, Deriabin still believed Nosenko was a KGB plant.

Peter Deriabin noticed many inconsistencies and errors in Nosenko's accounts:

Nosenko "could not describe in detail how such a [KGB file] check is done..."
Nosenko, having ostensibly served as a security officer for delegations, "could not even explain how Soviet citizens are checked... before going abroad."
Nosenko "knew so little about day-to-day procedures... that one can only conclude that he had never been a KGB officer, at least not in Moscow..."
 
When the interrogations led to no substantial results the interrogators were changed, and after a new team was brought on, Nosenko was cleared of all suspicions and released with pay. The question of whether Nosenko was a KGB plant is controversial, and those who handled him initially still believe that his unsolicited walk-in was designed by the KGB to protect a Soviet mole threatened by Golitsyn's knowledge, and his defection by a Soviet desire to discredit the idea of a connection between the Soviet Union and the actions of Lee Harvey Oswald. Others have argued Nosenko was ultimately regarded as an authentic defector through misinformation from another KGB agent that was thought to be a genuine defector, code-named Fedora. Fedora corroborated Nosenko's authenticity and allegations, specifically that he was indeed a Lt. Colonel of the KGB and that he indeed received recalling orders just before fleeing to the USA. Nosenko confessed later after failing to pass successive poly examinations that he was in reality a KGB captain, while, after NSA revealed that no recall orders ever reached Geneva Soviet embassy, he confessed that he also lied about that.

Nosenko has later claimed to have been tortured and even at one point, he said during interrogation, he was given LSD, and it almost killed him. The guards revived him by dragging him into the shower and alternating the water between hot and cold. These claims have been denied by Richard Helms who was Director of Central Intelligence during the most intense part of Nosenko's interrogation.

Golitsyn's defection led the KGB to notify fifty-four Rezidentura to temporarily suspend all meetings with important agents. The KGB also made significant efforts to discredit Golitsyn by promoting disinformation that he was involved in illegal smuggling operations. After five years, in 1967, KGB assassination and sabotage section under Viktor Vladimirov finally discovered Golitsyn's CIA hideout in Canada and attempted unsuccessfully to assassinate him.

Nosenko's case officer was Tennent H. "Pete" Bagley, both when they first met in Geneva in 1962 and subsequently when he defected in 1964. Bagley, subsequently chief of counterintelligence for the Soviet Russia ("SR") Division and Division Deputy Director, wrote a book that was substantially about the Nosenko case. In response to Bagley's book, other members of the intelligence community have re-examined the Nosenko case and repeated Bagley's concerns. CIA operations officer George Kisevalter, well regarded for his prior handling of Major Pyotr Popov, the first Soviet GRU officer run by the CIA, and a native Russian speaker, was detailed to assist Bagley. In 2013 Bagley wrote another book, revealing new details he acquired by comparing notes with Soviet KGB Chief Sergey Kondrashev. Bagley says he had always suspected that Nosenko might be a plant and was glad to have this confirmed by Kondrashev. Both Bagley and Kondrashev expressed surprise that CIA had accepted Nosenko as genuine for as long as they had, despite more than 30 warning signs.

Aftermath
On March 1, 1969, Nosenko was formally acknowledged to be a genuine defector, and released, with $80,000 worth of financial compensation from the CIA. He was also provided with a new identity to live out his life in the South of the US.

The harsh treatment he received as part of the early US interrogation was one of the "abuses" documented in the Central Intelligence Agency "Family Jewels" documents in 1973. In an internal note at the CIA in 1978, then DCI Stansfield Turner, referring to Nosenko's solitary confinement, stated:

The case has been examined in several books, and the 1986 movie Yuri Nosenko: Double Agent starring Tommy Lee Jones. The movie depicted the intense debate over whether Nosenko was an actual defector.

He exposed John Vassall, a British civil servant already revealed as a KGB agent by Golitsyn and eventually charged for spying in 1962, and Robert Lee Johnson, a U.S. Marine in Berlin arrested in 1964.

Nosenko lived in the US under an assumed name until his death.

17 audio files of interviews of Nosenko during the investigation of the Kennedy assassination were made public by the National Archives on July 24, 2017.

See also
 List of Eastern Bloc defectors
 List of KGB defectors
 Rufus Taylor

References

Bibliography
  https://archive.org/details/SpyWarsMolesMysteriesAndDeadlyGames/mode/2up

 
 
 
 
 

1927 births
2008 deaths
American spies against the Soviet Union
KGB officers
Soviet emigrants to the United States
Moscow State Institute of International Relations alumni
Soviet intelligence personnel who defected to the United States
People from Mykolaiv
People sentenced to death in absentia by the Soviet Union